The friggitello (plural friggitelli) is a sweet Italian chili pepper of the species Capsicum annuum. It is also known as the Golden Greek pepper, Sweet Italian pepper, or Tuscan pepper. In the United States they may be called "pepperoncini"; they are quite distinct from Italian peperoncini, which are hot Italian chili peppers. In the United States, they may also be called  Greek golden pepperoncini peppers or mild golden Salonika peppers.  The friggitello is mild with a slight heat and a hint of bitterness, and is sometimes pickled and sold in jars. In Italy the friggitello is most associated with Tuscany. The Greek variety, which is sweeter, is commonly used elsewhere in Europe and the United States.

Cultivation 
Like many other cultivars of Capsicum annuum, the friggitello requires a warm climate with a lot of sunlight and is not tolerant of frost. The seeds take 10 to 14 days to germinate, after which the plant will reach maturity in 70 to 80 days. It appreciates slightly rich and well-drained soils, but overfertilized soil will result in fewer fruits. The plant has the potential to grow plenty of fruits, so it requires staking if it is to be prevented from falling over due to the weight of the fruits. Mature fruits will eventually turn red, but it is best to pick them while they are still green.

Culinary use 

Even though it is often pickled, the friggitello has a complex flavor which is appreciated most when it is eaten fresh. It lends itself very well to sautéing, stuffing and popping. It combines nicely with fruits and is a suitable ingredient to use in salads and compotes or on sandwiches.

They are also often served with kebab, such as İskender kebap. Pickled friggitelli can vary in color from bright yellow to bright yellow-green. Sometimes coloring is added. If pickled, friggitelli are sometimes briefly rinsed in cold water before serving to reduce the effects of the pickling brine on the taste.

References

Sources 

 
 

Capsicum cultivars
Chili peppers
Italian cuisine